University of Cambridge Museums is a consortium of the eight museums of the University of Cambridge.

The consortium works in partnership with the Cambridge University Botanic Garden and other Cambridge University collections. It was awarded Major Partner Museums status by Arts Council England in 2012.  

The consortium comprises:
 Fitzwilliam Museum
 Museum of Archaeology and Anthropology
 The Polar Museum
 The Sedgwick Museum of Earth Sciences
 Museum of Classical Archaeology
 The Whipple Museum of the History of Science
 Kettle's Yard
 University Museum of Zoology

References

External links